Togia-Pule-toaki was the eighth and possibly final patu-iki of the Pacific Ocean island of Niue, taking power in 1896 following the death of the previous incumbent, Fata-a-iki, and formally ordained on June 30, 1898.

Under Togia-Pule-toaki's reign, laws were adopted forbidding the sale of Niuean lands to foreigners, and the sale of liquor to Niueans. His reign saw the formal relinquishing of Niuean independence to the British Empire on April 21, But there still remained a Patu iki or king, the successor is Haetaua. On September 11, 1900, Togia-Pulu-toaki formally welcomed a resident representative of the imperial government to the island.

Togia-Pule-toaki remained alive in Niue in 1903, when Percy Smith published his study on the island, Niuē-fekai (or Savage) Island and its People. The Niuean Kingdom's dynasty was succeeded by Patu iki Haetaua who has living descendants to this day, they are also known as the Kahui Patu liki, or Royal Family of the last Monarch of Niue.

Sources

S. Percy Smith, Niuē-fekai (or Savage) Island and its People, 1903, pp. 36–44

Year of birth unknown
Year of death unknown
History of Niue
Niuean monarchs